FC Khimik Krasnoperekopsk was an amateur Ukrainian football club based in Krasnoperekopsk, Crimea. The club was founded in 1951. They competed in the Ukrainian Second League for 3 seasons.  After the 2007–08 season the club didn't submit a license and elected to remove themselves from the PFL.

League and cup history (Ukraine)

{|class="wikitable"
|-bgcolor="#efefef"
! Season
! Div.
! Pos.
! Pl.
! W
! D
! L
! GS
! GA
! P
!Domestic Cup
!colspan=2|Europe
!Notes
|- align=center bgcolor=SteelBlue
|align=center|2002
|align=center|5th Crimean Championship
|align=center|6/18
|align=center|34
|align=center|19
|align=center|6
|align=center|9
|align=center|63
|align=center|50
|align=center|63
|align=center|
|align=center|
|align=center|
|align=center|
|- bgcolor=SteelBlue
|align=center|2003
|align=center|5th Crimean Championship
|align=center|7/15
|align=center|28
|align=center|12
|align=center|2
|align=center|14
|align=center|35
|align=center|43
|align=center|51
|align=center|
|align=center|
|align=center|
|align=center|
|- bgcolor=SteelBlue
|align=center|2004
|align=center|5th Crimean Championship
|align=center bgcolor=gold|1/15
|align=center|28
|align=center|25
|align=center|1
|align=center|2
|align=center|78
|align=center|14
|align=center|76
|align=center|
|align=center|
|align=center|
|align=center bgcolor=lightgreen|Admitted to Amateur League
|- bgcolor=SteelBlue
|align=center|2004
|align=center|4th Amateur League Gr. E
|align=center|4/4
|align=center|4
|align=center|1
|align=center|1
|align=center|2
|align=center|2
|align=center|3
|align=center|4
|align=center|
|align=center|
|align=center|
|align=center|
|- bgcolor=SteelBlue
|align=center|2005
|align=center|5th Crimean Championship
|align=center|7/14
|align=center|26
|align=center|11
|align=center|4
|align=center|11
|align=center|46
|align=center|62
|align=center|37
|align=center|
|align=center|
|align=center|
|align=center bgcolor=brick|Admitted
|- align=center bgcolor=PowderBlue
|align=center|2005–06
|align=center|3rd Second League Gr. B
|align=center|6/15
|align=center|28
|align=center|11
|align=center|5
|align=center|12
|align=center|24
|align=center|30
|align=center|38
|align=center| finals
|align=center|
|align=center|
|align=center|
|- bgcolor=PowderBlue
|align=center|2006–07
|align=center|3rd Second League Gr. B
|align=center|5/15
|align=center|28
|align=center|13
|align=center|7
|align=center|8
|align=center|35
|align=center|28
|align=center|46
|align=center| finals
|align=center|
|align=center|
|align=center|
|- bgcolor=PowderBlue
|align=center|2007–08
|align=center|3rd Second League Gr. B
|align=center|4/18
|align=center|34
|align=center|21
|align=center|6
|align=center|7
|align=center|54
|align=center|28
|align=center|69
|align=center| finals
|align=center|
|align=center|
|align=center bgcolor=lightgrey|Withdrew
|- align=center bgcolor=SteelBlue
|align=center|2008
|align=center|5th Crimean Championship
|align=center|7/13
|align=center|11
|align=center|8
|align=center|3
|align=center|1
|align=center|37
|align=center|15
|align=center|27
|align=center|
|align=center|
|align=center|
|align=center|
|- bgcolor=SteelBlue
|align=center|2009
|align=center|5th Crimean Championship
|align=center bgcolor=tan|3/12
|align=center|21
|align=center|14
|align=center|1
|align=center|6
|align=center|68
|align=center|24
|align=center|43
|align=center|
|align=center|
|align=center|
|align=center|
|- bgcolor=SteelBlue
|align=center|2010
|align=center|5th Crimean Championship
|align=center bgcolor=gold|1/12
|align=center|22
|align=center|17
|align=center|4
|align=center|1
|align=center|73
|align=center|21
|align=center|55
|align=center|
|align=center|
|align=center|
|align=center|
|- bgcolor=SteelBlue
|align=center|2011
|align=center|5th Crimean Championship
|align=center|7/13
|align=center|22
|align=center|10
|align=center|4
|align=center|8
|align=center|38
|align=center|27
|align=center|34
|align=center|
|align=center|
|align=center|
|align=center|
|- bgcolor=SteelBlue
|align=center|2012
|align=center|5th Crimean Championship
|align=center bgcolor=silver|2/12
|align=center|22
|align=center|16
|align=center|4
|align=center|2
|align=center|75
|align=center|21
|align=center|52
|align=center|
|align=center|
|align=center|
|align=center bgcolor=lightgrey|Withdrew
|}

Honours
Crimea championship (Ukrainian Lower League Tier)
  2004, 2010

References

 
Defunct football clubs in Crimea
Association football clubs established in 1951
Association football clubs disestablished in 2012
1951 establishments in the Soviet Union
2012 disestablishments in Ukraine